Mola tecta, the hoodwinker sunfish, belongs to the family Molidae and genus Mola. It is closely related to the more widely known ocean sunfish (Mola mola). The Latin word "tecta" means hidden. The word "hidden" was adopted for the name because the fish has blended in among other species of sunfish for a long time and has only been discovered recently. Discovered on a beach near Christchurch, New Zealand, in 2015, it was the first new species of sunfish to be identified in 130 years. Mola tecta are mostly discovered in the temperate region of the Southern Hemisphere in the water near Australia, New Zealand, Southern Chile and Southern Africa. It was first described by Marianne Nyegaard, a marine scientist who studied ocean sunfish for her PhD.

Description
The hoodwinker sunfish is a congener of (in the same genus as) the more widely known ocean sunfish, Mola mola. Mola tecta, like other Mola species, has a flat, almost symmetrical oval shape. It has a smooth body shape, no bump and has a maximum length of 242cm (about 7.9 feet). It does not have spines in its fins nor real caudal fin (tail fin). Its scales have evolved into small spines. Like  cartilaginous fish, Mola tecta has counter shading, which means that it has a darker color on the dorsal side than on the ventral side. Compared to other Mola species, Mola tecta is slimmer, has a sleeker adult body shape, and lacks a protruding snout and lumps along the tail fin. Parasites are found in all the dissected Mola tecta.

History
There are three extant species under the genus Mola: Mola mola, Mola alexandrini, and Mola tecta.

Mola mola is the most common known ocean sunfish and was found in 1758 and Mola alexandrini (also called Mola ramsayi) was found 81 years afterward, in 1839. In comparison to its two relatives, Mola tecta was found recently in 2014. In 2004, ten years before Mola tecta was officially named in 2014, Japanese researchers found out that there was a new Mola species based on the genetic information they obtained from the Australian water. However, they were not able to obtain more information about this new Mola species and they did not know exactly what this Mola species looked like. According to Nyegaard, the first person who described Mola tecta, the Mola tecta are hard to study because they are hard to find and their huge size makes them difficult to store.

Distribution
Discovered on a beach near Christchurch, New Zealand, in 2014, the hoodwinker sunfish was the first new species of sunfish to be identified in 130 years. It is thought to live primarily in the Southern Hemisphere and has been found in waters off New Zealand, Australia, South Africa, and Chile. There are, however, three recorded cases of it being found in the Northern Hemisphere: one (previously thought to be a Mola mola) in Ameland in the Netherlands in 1889 and a 7-foot (2.1m) specimen that washed up near Santa Barbara, California in 2019. Mola alexandrini, another Mola species has been found in the Southern Pacific. Mola mola, in comparison, is the most widespread species and has been found in all the major oceans except for the polar area.

Diet
Their diet consists of salps and nectonic siphonophore because these two organisms are found in the digestive tract of Mola tecta.

References

Further reading

External links 

 The hoodwinker sunfish discussed in RNZ Critter of the Week, 29 April 2022

hoodwinker sunfish
Marine fish of South Africa
Fish of Oceania
hoodwinker sunfish